Elections were held in Zimbabwe on 23 March 1990 to elect the President and Parliament. Robert Mugabe of the Zimbabwe African National Union – Patriotic Front (ZANU–PF) was reelected President with 83 percent of the vote against Edgar Tekere of the Zimbabwe Unity Movement, who received 17 percent. ZANU–PF won 117 of the 120 elected seats in Parliament, which after the abolition of the Senate in 1989 consisted of the unicameral House of Assembly.

President

Parliament

Summary

Constituency results 
The 120 elected seats in the House of Assembly were filled via first-past-the-post voting in single-member districts. ZANU–PF won 116 seats, the Zimbabwe Unity Movement won two, and ZANU–Ndonga took one. Elections could not be held on election day in Chimanimani because the ballots printed for that constituency did not include the candidates' names, but ZANU–PF won that seat as well when elections were held at a later date. Turnout figures include spoilt ballots and thus are not exact totals of the vote counts listed for the candidates in a constituency.

Notes and references

Notes

References 

1990 in Zimbabwe
Election results in Zimbabwe